Shoko Center-iriguchi is a Hiroden station on Hiroden Miyajima Line, located south side of the JR Shin-Inokuchi Station in Inokuchi, Nishi-ku, Hiroshima.

Routes
From Hiroden-itsukaichi Station, there is one of Hiroden Streetcar routes.
 Hiroshima Station - Hiroden-miyajima-guchi Route

Connections
█ Miyajima Line

Kusatsu-minami — Shoko Center-iriguchi — Inokuchi

Other services connections

JR lines
JR lines connections at JR Shin-Inokuchi Station
Shoko Center-iriguchi Station is directly connected to the JR Shin-Inokuchi Station by the stairs and pedestrian overpass.

Bus services routes
Bus services routes connections at Shin-Inokuchi Station
Bus services routes connections at Alpark Bus Terminal

Around station

Alpark
Hiroshima Sun Plaza
Hiroden Arate-shako - (streetcar shed)

History
Opened as "Inokuchi-byoin-mae" on September 1, 1960.
Renamed to "Arate-shako-mae" in 1971.
Renamed to the present station name "Shoko Center-iriguchi" on November 1, 1979.
Connected to the pedestrian overpass between Alpark and JR Shin-Inokuchi Station on November 30, 1989.

See also
Hiroden Streetcar Lines and Routes

External links
Inokuchi Town Map

Hiroden Miyajima Line stations
Railway stations in Japan opened in 1960